The Liberian Council of Churches is an ecumenical Christian organization in Liberia. It was founded in 1982 and is a member of the World Council of Churches. Rev. Christopher Wleh Toe,I. is the present General Secretary of the Liberia Council of Churches. A Peacebuilder and advocate for justice. 
. Presiding Elder in the AME Zion Church in Liberia.

External links  

World Council of Churches listing

Christian organizations established in 1982
 
Christian organizations based in Africa
Christianity in Liberia
National councils of churches
1982 establishments in Liberia
Religious organizations based in Liberia